Khaptad Lake is a lake in Doti district of western Nepal.

See also
 Khaptad National Park

References

Lakes of Sudurpashchim Province